Sven-Olof Israelsson (born 13 May 1948) is a Swedish skier. He competed in the Nordic combined event at the 1972 Winter Olympics.

His father Sven Israelsson won a bronze medal in the Nordic combined at the 1948 Olympics.

References

External links
 

1948 births
Living people
Swedish male Nordic combined skiers
Olympic Nordic combined skiers of Sweden
Nordic combined skiers at the 1972 Winter Olympics
People from Dalarna